Mallu Bhatti Vikramarka (born 15 June 1961) is an Indian politician who was the second leader of opposition in Telangana Legislative Assembly. He was elected as the member of legislative assembly in 2009 and 2014 elections. He was the chief whip for Government of Andhra Pradesh from 2009 to 2011 and also served as the Deputy Speaker of Andhra Pradesh Legislative Assembly from 2011 to 2014. He represents Madhira constituency. He belongs to the INC.

Early life
Mallu Bhatti Vikramarka was born to Mallu Akanda and Mallu Manikyam. His native village is Snanala Laxmipuram in Wyra mandal (Khammam district). He did his Graduation from Nizam College, Hyderabad and Post Graduation from University of Hyderabad. He has two brothers, A R Mallu and Mallu Ravi, who is a former Member of Parliament.

Career
Mallu Bhatti Vikramarka was elected as MLA for the first time in 2009. He became the Chief Whip in 2009. Before that he was elected as MLC.

He was elected as Deputy Speaker of Andhra Pradesh Legislative Assembly on 4 June 2011.

Second time he was elected as an MLA in General Elections, 2014 from Madhira Constituency.

Third time also he was elected as an MLA in General Elections, 2019 from Madhira Constituency. After Bodepudi Venkateswar Rao, he became the second  person to score a hat trick as an MLA from Madhira Constituency.

On 18 January 2019, INC President Rahul Gandhi appointed Mallu Bhatti Vikramarka as the leader of Congress Legislature Party (CLP) in 2nd Telangana Assembly.

Personal life
Mallu Bhatti Vikramarka is married to Nandini and has two sons.

Positions held
 PCC Executive Member (1990–92)
 PCC Secretary (2000–03)
 MLC 2007 Khammam
 Leader of opposition in Telangana Legislative Assembly. (2018-19)

References

People from Khammam district
Indian National Congress politicians from Telangana
Andhra Pradesh MLAs 2009–2014
Telangana MLAs 2014–2018
Telangana MLAs 2018–2023
Living people
1961 births
Deputy Speakers of the Andhra Pradesh Legislative Assembly
University of Hyderabad alumni
Indian National Congress politicians from Andhra Pradesh